Bernardo Ortiz de Montellano (Mexico City, January 3, 1899 – Mexico City, April 13, 1949) was a modern Mexican poet, literary critic, editor, and teacher.

Ortiz de Montellano visited the Escuela Nacional Preparatoria. He taught at the Escuela de Verano, a school of the Universidad Nacional Autónoma de México (UNAM), and served as bookrevisor of the Secretaría de Educación Pública (SEP).

He was member of the literary group Nuevo Ateneo de la Juventud, which was founded in 1918 by Ortiz de Montellano, Jaime Torres Bodet, José Gorostiza, and others. The members of the group wrote for magazines and journals. In 1928 he was co-founder of the magazine "Contemporáneos" and was director of it from June 1928 through December 1931. He was also an occasional editor of the literary magazine "Letras de México", published from 1937 to 1947,  chief-editor of "El Trovador", and was co-founder of the Cuadernos Americanos group.

Works 
 Avidez, 1921
 El trompo de los siete colores, 1925
 Antología de cuentos mexicanos (prose)
 Red, 1928
 Literatura de la Revolución y literatura revolucionaria (essay), 1930
 Pantomima (theatrical piece), 1930
 Primer sueño, 1931
 El Sombrerón, (theatrical piece), 1931
 Sueños, 1933
 La poesía indígena de México, 1935
 Muerte del cielo azul, 1936
 Martes de carnaval Figura, amor y muerte de Amado Nervo (biographical work), 1943
 El Sombrerón, 1946
 La cabeza de Salomé Sombra y luz de Ramón López Velarde (biographical work), 1946
 Literatura indígena y colonial mexicana (essay), 1946
 Conversación epistolar a propósito del libro Sueños, 1946

Compiled and posthumously edited:
 Sueño y poesía, by Wilberto Cantón, 1952
 Obras en Prosa'', by María de Lourdes Franco Bagnouls, 1988

References

Mexican male writers
Writers from Mexico City
Mexican literary critics
1899 births
1949 deaths